Pacinian corpuscle or lamellar corpuscle or Vater-Pacini corpuscle; is one of the four major types of mechanoreceptors (specialized nerve ending with adventitious tissue for mechanical sensation) found in mammalian skin. This type of mechanoreceptor is found in both glabrous (hairless) and hirsute (hairy) skins, viscera, joints and attached to periosteum of bone, primarily responsible for sensitivity to vibration. Few of them are also sensitive to quasi-static or low frequency pressure stimulus. Most of them respond only to sudden disturbances and are especially sensitive to vibration of few hundreds of Hz. The vibrational role may be used for detecting surface texture, e.g., rough vs. smooth. Most of the Pacinian corpuscles act as rapidly adapting mechanoreceptors. Groups of corpuscles respond to pressure changes, e.g. on grasping or releasing an object.

Structure
Pacinian corpuscles are larger and fewer in number than Meissner's corpuscle, Merkel cells and Ruffini's corpuscles.

The Pacinian corpuscle is approximately oval-cylindrical-shaped and 1 mm in length. The entire corpuscle is wrapped by a layer of connective tissue.  Its capsule consists of 20 to 60 concentric lamellae (hence the alternative lamellar corpuscle) including fibroblasts and fibrous connective tissue (mainly Type IV and Type II collagen network), separated by gelatinous material, more than 92% of which is water. It presents a whorled pattern on micrographs.

Function
Pacinian corpuscles are rapidly adapting (phasic) receptors that detect gross pressure changes and vibrations in the skin. Any deformation in the corpuscle causes action potentials to be generated by opening pressure-sensitive sodium ion channels in the axon membrane. This allows sodium ions to flow into the cell, creating a receptor potential.

These corpuscles are especially sensitive to vibrations, which they can sense even centimeters away. Their optimal sensitivity is 250 Hz, and this is the frequency range generated upon fingertips by textures made of features smaller than 1 µm. Pacinian corpuscles respond when the skin is rapidly indented but not when the pressure is steady, due to the layers of connective tissue that cover the nerve ending. It is thought that they respond to high-velocity changes in joint position. They have also been implicated in detecting the location of touch sensations on handheld tools.

Pacinian corpuscles have a large receptive field on the skin's surface with an especially sensitive center.

Mechanism
Pacinian corpuscles sense stimuli due to the deformation of their lamellae, which press on the membrane of the sensory neuron and causes it to bend or stretch. When the lamellae are deformed, due to either pressure or release of pressure, a generator potential is created as it physically deforms the plasma membrane of the receptive area of the neuron, making it "leak" Na+ ions. If this potential reaches a certain threshold, nerve impulses or action potentials are formed by pressure-sensitive sodium channels at the first node of Ranvier, the first node of the myelinated section of the neurite inside the capsule. This impulse is now transferred along the axon with the use of sodium channels and sodium/potassium pumps in the axon membrane.

Once the receptive area of the neurite is depolarized, it will depolarize the first node of Ranvier; however, as it is a rapidly adapting fibre, this does not carry on indefinitely, and the signal propagation ceases. This is a graded response, meaning that the greater the deformation, the greater the generator potential. This information is encoded in the frequency of impulses, since a bigger or faster deformation induces a higher impulse frequency. Action potentials are formed when the skin is rapidly distorted but not when pressure is continuous because of the mechanical filtering of the stimulus in the lamellar structure. The frequencies of the impulses decrease quickly and soon stop due to the relaxation of the inner layers of connective tissue that cover the nerve ending.

Discovery
Pacinian corpuscles were the first cellular sensory receptor ever observed. They were first reported by German anatomist and botanist Abraham Vater and his student Johannes Gottlieb Lehmann in 1741, but ultimately named after Italian anatomist Filippo Pacini, who rediscovered them in 1835. John Shekleton, a curator of the Royal College of Surgeons in Ireland, also discovered them before Pacini, but his results were published later. Similar to Pacinian corpuscles, Herbst corpuscles and Grandry corpuscles are found in avian species.

Additional images

See also 
 Pallesthesia
 List of human anatomical parts named after people
 Pacinian neuroma – a very rare benign tumor of Pacinian corpuscles
 Rayleigh wave#Possible detection by animals

References

External links
 Virginia Commonwealth University
 
 Medical Illustration

Sensory receptors